The Cologne Bonn Region (German: Region Köln/Bonn) is a metropolitan area in North Rhine-Westphalia (NRW), Germany, covering the cities of Cologne, Bonn and Leverkusen, as well as the districts of Rheinisch-Bergischer Kreis, Oberbergischer Kreis, Rhein-Erft-Kreis and Rhein-Sieg-Kreis. The region covers an area of 3,839 km² with 3.13 million inhabitants (population density 815/km²). The city centres of Cologne and Bonn are 24 kilometres apart as the crow flies. At the outer city limits, there are only 8 kilometres between Cologne-Libur and Bonn-Geislar.

The Cologne/Bonn Region was established by local governments within the Cologne Government Region in 1992, to promote common policies in regional and urban planning, traffic management, environment and investment. Among the most prominent co-operative projects are the Cologne/Bonn Airport, the Verkehrsverbund Rhein-Sieg and the former Bonn–Cologne Railway Company. Also the Stadtbahn of both cities are connected, so there are light rail trains from Cologne Stadtbahn in Bonn and the Bonn Stadtbahn in Cologne. The largest local banks, Sparkasse KölnBonn and Volksbank Köln Bonn, operate in both cities. Both cities are directly connected by the autobahn A555.

The Cologne/Bonn region lies within the larger Rhine-Ruhr region, and forms a counterbalance to the more integrated Ruhr area, which also lies within the Rhine-Ruhr. Since 2008, studies have been undertaken to incorporate cities of the Lower Rhine region (most notably the city of Düsseldorf) into the alliance, in order to form a Rhineland metropolitan region (Metropolregion Rheinland).

Larger Urban Zones
Eurostat's Urban Audit splits the Cologne/Bonn region into two Larger Urban Zones (LUZ). These two Urban Zones do not cover the district of Oberbergischer Kreis.  

Population figures for 2012

See also
 Rhine-Ruhr Metropolitan Region
 Ruhr Metropolitan Region
 Metropolitan regions in Germany

References

External links
 Region Köln/Bonn 
 Regional Marketing Cologne Bonn Ltd 

Geography of Cologne
Bonn
Leverkusen
Rhineland
Metropolitan areas of Germany
Regions of North Rhine-Westphalia